Yugo-Zapad Municipal Okrug or South-West Municipal Okrug, formerly called Municipal Okrug #37, is a municipal okrug of Krasnoselsky District of the federal city of St. Petersburg, Russia. Population:

References

Krasnoselsky District, Saint Petersburg